Xylophis mosaicus, the Anamalai wood snake, is a species of snake in the family Pareidae. It is endemic to the Western Ghats of India.

Geographic range
X. mosaicus is found in the Anamalai region of the Western Ghats in the Indian states of Kerala and Tamil Nadu.

References

Pareidae
Snakes of Asia
Reptiles of India
Endemic fauna of the Western Ghats
Reptiles described in 2020
Taxa named by Veerappan Deepak